Bolshaya Kyama is a rural locality (a settlement) in Obozerskoye Urban Settlement of Plesetsky District, Arkhangelsk Oblast, Russia. The population was 3 as of 2010.

Geography 
Bolshaya Kyama is located 142 km north of Plesetsk (the district's administrative centre) by road. Pervomaysky is the nearest rural locality.

References 

Rural localities in Plesetsky District